Great Barford Castle, later known as "Creakers Manor", was a Norman castle located in the village of Great Barford, in the county of Bedfordshire, England.

Great Barford Castle was a Motte and bailey castle, made of timber, and surrounded by a moat. It was so named due to its location, just north of the parish of Great Barford. It is located 1 mile south of Renhold Castle, leading to it sometimes being referred to as the "Second Renhold". The castle is also located near two other castles; Bedford Castle, which is 5 miles away, and Gannock Castle, which is 6 miles east of it.

Early history
Originally thought to have been built just after the Norman Invasion (1066), when William the Conqueror commanded the building of so many castles in defense of his new position as King of England, it is now known to have been built after the Domesday Book (1086) was commissioned.

By 1250, the castle was standing, and was in the possession of James de Crevequeor (d. 1263), the family from which it derived its later name of "Creakers Manor". James' eldest son Robert died in the same year as his father and it is unknown if he ever held the castle. In 1302/1303 the castle was in the possession of James' youngest son James de Crevequeor. By 1416, it had passed to Stephen de Crevequeor, grandson of the first mentioned James, and his wife Anne, who were still holding it in 1530. Their son John de Crevequeor (d. 1370) was holding it as of 1346, and upon his death without issue, his nephew Stephen de Crevequeor (d. 1370), son of John's brother Geoffrey, inherited the property. Stephen died shortly after inheriting the estate, while still underage, and the property passed to Stephen's younger brother, John Crevequer, on the attainment of his majority in 1385. This is when the castle was first referred to, in historical documents, as "Creaker's Manor", and was hencefore known as such. The manor was held, in 1428, by Stephen Crevequer, a son or grandson of the afore mentioned John Crevequeor. Stephen Crevequer is listed as one of the Bedfordshire gentry in 1433, but there in no mention of the manor.

Later history
The manor is not mentioned again until 1511, when William FitzJeffrey of Thurleigh died and the manor is listed in his possession passing to his son John FitzJeffrey, son of his first wife.

John FitzJeffrey died in 1535, and his widow Joan retained the property until her death a year later, when it passed to John's half-brother George FitzJeffrey, who had been first married to the daughter of John Baptist. On George's death in 1575, the manor was left to his second wife, Judith Throckmorton, of the famous Throckmorton family of that period. She married John Rolt of Milton Ernest. Judith and John transferred the manor, in 1589, to George's son George FitzJeffrey, who was knighted in 1606. George died in 1618 without heir, his son having predeceased him in 1616, and was buried on the property in December of that same year. The property was sold and later held by the Chandler, Mander, Peck, and Halsey families, until being sold in 1770 to the Pedley family.

It is believed that the manor mentioned in 1511 is not the original pre-12th century structure, the original having been destroyed, or having fallen into ruin, and the remains reincorporated into the manor mentioned. However, nothing is known for certain.

Present
By 1820 the manor had ceased to exist as a manor, a priory having since been built on its location. Little is left of the original dwelling, with only cropmarks and slight earthworks remaining.

References

Castles in Bedfordshire